Chinese Marine Corps may refer to:
Republic of China Marine Corps
People's Liberation Army Marine Corps
People's Liberation Army Amphibious Brigades